The first season of Muodin huipulle (Finnish, "To the Top of Fashion") started airing on Finland's MTV3 on 1 October 2009 at 20.00. The show was hosted by fashion designer and entrepreneur Minna Cheung in Heidi Klum's role and fashion editor and host Jaakko Selin fills Tim Gunn's role as fashion mentor.

The winner of Muodin huipulle received a one-year contract with Spalt PR, one year cooperation with L'Oreal Paris hair and makeup, and a Bernina Sewing Machine worth €6,000. In addition to this, the winner's collection was featured in the February 2010 issue of Finnish fashion magazine Olivia.

Contestants

Designers

In order of elimination:

(ages listed are the designers' ages at the time the show was taped in the summer of 2009)

Note: Mirkka and Jarno were both eliminated in the same episode; their names are listed alphabetically.

Models
Aleksa
Hanna-Maaria
Inka
Jessica
Elina
Liis
Suada
Katriina
Fana
Olga
Sonja
Liina
Milla

Season 1 Challenges

 The designer won Muodin huipulle.
 The designer won the challenge.
 The designer had one of the highest scores for that challenge, but did not win.
 The designer had one of the lowest scores for that challenge, but was not eliminated.
 The designer was in the bottom two, but was not eliminated.
 The designer lost and was out of the competition.
 The designer was eliminated in a double elimination.

: Although Katri and Mirkka had low scores, there was no bottom two in episode 9, and no one was eliminated. Instead, Mert and Jarno were in the bottom two, but in fact being the "top two".
: Maria was in the bottom three in episode 10, where there was double elimination.

: It was only announced in episode 4 that the models were in competition as well and Kati was eliminated. Models before episode 4 are not considered in this chart.
: Because there no designer was eliminated in episode 9, no models were eliminated in episode 10.
: There was no challenge in episode 11, so there were no winning or losing designs.

 Light green background and WINNER means the model won Muodin huipulle.
 Blue background and WIN means the model wore the winning design that episode.
 Red background and IN means the model wore the losing design that episode.
 Light gray background and OUT means the model was not picked and was out of the competition.

Episode summaries
Note: No episode titles are given in Finnish on the Muodin huipulle official webpage. Episode titles given here are not official and only reflect the nature of the challenges.

Episode 1: Designer's Philosophy
The designers met each other at their new home for the competition then were taken to their work space at Design Factory of Aalto University. Jaakko Selin greets the designers and gives them their first challenge: make an evening outfit which describes the contestant's design philosophy. The fabric was hanging on clotheslines behind the school and the designers had five minutes to collect it. Although Antti P was given low points for his juhannus dress, and Minna Cheung did not like it at all, judges Anssi Tuupainen and Teemu Muurimäki commended him for telling a Finnish story in the design. The judges found Hely's dress too over-designed and Hanna-Maria's outfit as "super boring". The winner received immunity for the next challenge.

Judges: Minna Cheung, Anssi Tuupainen
Guest Judge: Teemu Muurimäki
WINNER: Katri
OUT: Hanna-Maaria
First Aired: 1 October 2009

Episode 2: Red Carpet
The designers are brought to the Tennispalatsi multiplex where they meet with the head of PR for L’Oréal, Nora Soini. The challenge is to make a dress suitable for the red carpet, with an emphasis on glamour, classic and design. The winner's garment will be featured on a limited edition bottle of L’Oréal Elnett hair spray in November 2009. The designers were given 30 minutes to sketch and a budget of €250 for fabric at Eurokangas. The criticism of the judges was that Mert's dress had too much going on, Olga's was poorly constructed and, although the dress was beautifully executed and showed classic glamour, Antti P's dress was too classic. This was the second win in a row for Katri.

Judges: Minna Cheung, Anssi Tuupainen
Guest Judge: Nora Soini
WINNER: Katri
OUT: Silja
First Aired: 8 October 2009

Episode 3: Nannywear
The designers must create an outfit for a nanny that is both stylish and functional. The materials for the design was waiting for the contestants on the university lawn: umbrellas. They were given 10 hours to complete the challenge. The judges criticised Maria's design for being poorly executed and Achille's garment for being non-functional. The winner received immunity for the next challenge.

Judges: Minna Cheung, Anssi Tuupainen
Guest Judge: Seija Lukkala
WINNER: Laura
OUT: Achilles
First Aired: 15 October 2009

Episode 4: Recycled Sweaters
Minna Cheung announces that Muodin huipulle is a competition for the designers' models too and that the winner will get an editorial spread in Olivia magazine. Antti P decides to take Achilles' (who was eliminated in the previous episode) model Elina. The designers are shocked when Hely decides to switch and take Katri's model Suada. The models then meet famous Finnish fashion designer Hanna Sarén who talks about recycling. Each designer gets a box filled with old sweaters and must create a bold look for a woman who wants to stand out in a crowd. The judges criticise Antti P for having a lack of boldness although great workmanship in the design and Hely for having no design in the garment. The judges also say that Antti A needs to refine his designs, although his signature tattered look was perfect for the challenge. A bitter Hely is eliminated, leaves without saying goodbye to her colleagues, and in her commentary, says that no one deserves to win Muodin huipulle. The winner received immunity for the next challenge.

Judges: Minna Cheung, Anssi Tuupainen
Guest Judge: Hanna Sarén
WINNER: Mert
OUT: Hely
First Aired: 22 October 2009

Episode 5: Lingonberry Cocktail Dress
The designers go visit the Fazer factory where Brand Manager Päivi Svens gives them their challenge: make an elegant cocktail dress inspired by the lingonberry in the new Nordic Gourmet flavours. The designers are given €200 and 25 minutes to shop at Eurokangas. At the end of the first day, the designers fit the dresses on their models, and take them to a cocktail party where they meet Fazer executives and influential professionals in the Finnish fashion industry. The two Anttis are in the bottom two: Antti A for being a one-note and Antti P for not having complete ideas and that his dress was poorly executed. The winner received immunity for the next challenge.

Judges: Minna Cheung, Anssi Tuupainen
Guest Judges: Minna Parikka, Päivi Svens
WINNER: Maria
OUT: Antti P
First Aired: 29 October 2009

Episode 6: Olivia Magazine
The designers meet with Fashion Editor of Olivia magazine, Sanna Sierilä, and given their next challenge: design an elegant, open collar and sleeveless dress for the Olivia woman. The idea behind the challenge is working with different kinds of material; in this case, the material was the magazine itself. The challenge winner's garment will be featured on the December 2009 cover of Olivia, worn by model Niina Herala. The designers are given 10 hours to work on their garments. The judges criticised Olga for not creating an Olivia woman look and Laura's dress for not living up to the challenge.

Judges: Minna Cheung, Anssi Tuupainen
Guest Judges: Niina Herala, Sanna Sierilä
WINNER: Jarno
OUT: Laura
First Aired: 5 November 2009

Episode 7: Jenni Vartiainen
The designers' challenge is to make a feminine outfit for Finnish pop singer Jenni Vartiainen for both the stage and television appearances. The budget is €200 and the designers have 12 hours to complete their garments. The designers must also create a headpiece for the outfit made from toys. Although both Olga and Antti A were criticised for not following the challenge criteria to the fullest extent, Antti A's story for his design saved him from elimination. The winner received immunity for the next challenge.

Judges: Minna Cheung, Anssi Tuupainen
Guest Judges: Jenni Vartiainen
WINNER: Katri
OUT: Olga
First Aired: 12 November 2009

Episode 8: Creativity, Volume, Masculinity and Femininity
The designers must find their creative sides with artist Ulla Kihlman by painting. After painting on large sheets outdoors, the designers must use these paintings as inspiration for their garments, which must play with volume and masculinity and femininity. The designers are given €100 and 15 minutes to shop for fabric and are also given 12 hours to complete their outfits. Even though he showed creativity, Antti A's violin dress was criticised for looking entirely too glued together, not using the colours of his painting and for looking too much like a costume for a children's play. The winner received immunity for the next challenge.

Judges: Minna Cheung, Anssi Tuupainen
Guest Judges: Merja Larivaara, Aki Choklat
WINNER: Maria
OUT: Antti A
First Aired: 19 November 2009

Episode 9: Urban Sportswear
The designers are brought to Kiasma Museum in Helsinki, where they are given 40 min to sketch and get inspiration for the next challenge: design urban sportswear for a woman on the go. They are taken to the Halti sportswear company's main headquarters where they meet head designer Martti Kellokumpu and where they get materials. The designers get 12 hours to complete the outfit. On the second day of the challenge, Jaakko Selin brings a box of old Halti hoods for an addition requirement: make a purse that will fit a credit card, a mobile phone and an MP3 player. Jarno and Mert are in the bottom two, only to find out that Mert is the winner and Jarno was scored second highest. No one is eliminated for this challenge.

Judges: Minna Cheung, Anssi Tuupainen
Guest Judges: Karita Tykkä, Martti Kellokumpu
WINNER: Mert
OUT: No one
First Aired: 26 November 2009

Episode 10: Avant-garde
Minna Cheung gives the designers the final challenge to determine who will make it to the finale: design an avant-garde outfit to match specific L'Oreal hair and make up looks which were preassigned to each model. The designers get €250, 30 minutes to shop and 8 hours to complete their work. Halfway through the challenge, Jarkko Selin announces that the designers may work on their outfits over night.

Judges: Minna Cheung, Anssi Tuupainen
Guest Judges: Daniel Palillo, Susanna Takkunen
WINNER: Katri
OUT: Mirkka and Jarno
First Aired: 3 December 2009

Episode 11: Finale, Part 1
After choosing their models Minna Cheung gives the designers their final challenge: create a collection of nine outfits for a special runway show. The budget is €2,000 and they have three months to complete their collections. Four weeks before the show, Jaakko Selin visits each designer in their hometowns: Maria in Tampere, Mert in Oulu and Katri in Lahti. During each visit, Jaakko gives the designers another challenge: create a tenth "showstopper" outfit to wow the audience. Three days before the runway show, the designers arrive back in Helsinki. They meet first with fashion designer Paola Suhonen for advise on the structure of a fashion show. Then, while Jaakko Selin is in Italy, Spalt PR Country manager and guest judge Siru Palmroos meets with each designer for mentoring.

Judges: None
Guest Judges: None
WINNER: None
OUT: None
First Aired: 10 December 2009

Episode 12: Finale, Part 2
The final runway show featured guest of honour Doutzen Kroes and Mario Cadenas from Project Runway season 1 in the audience. Kroes' personal favorite was Mert, whom she admired for his artistry. Mert's collection was inspired by his mother, who was an actress; Maria's collection was inspired by a Sitting Bull exhibition and Art Nouveau artists such as Alphonse Mucha; Katri's collection was inspired by nature. Maria's show featured a themed hairstyle, Katri's collection was easy to wear and Mart's collection was theatrical. The models consisted of the top three, who were slated to open each designer's show and close it with the showstopper, as well as the previously eliminated models. Liis, however, went missing. She was supposed to be one of Katri's models. The winner's collection and model will be featured in an issue of Olivia.

Judges: Minna Cheung, Anssi Tuupainen
Guest Judges: Siru Palmroos, Teemu Leino
WINNER of Muodin huipulle: Katri
OUT: Maria (1st Runner-Up) and Mert (2nd Runner-Up)
First Aired: 17 December 2009

References

External links
MTV3 homepage (in Finnish)
Muodin huipulle homepage

Contestants' official websites
Antti Asplund official website
Achilles Ion Gabriel official website
Silja Jeskanen-Wehber official website
Mirkka Metsola official website
Katri Niskanen official website
Antti Putkonen official website
Olga Sjöroos official website
Jarno Viitala official website

2009 Finnish television seasons
Season 01
2009 in fashion

fi:Muodin huipulle